Eloge Ethisse Enza Yamissi (born 23 January 1983) is a Central African former professional footballer who played as a midfielder.

Club career
Born in Bangui, Central African Republic, Yamissi started his playing career at Bordeaux. He was there one season and did not make a first team appearance. He then signed for La Roche VF, spending one season there, playing six games. He then moved to Olympique Alès, where he played only four games, before moving to Nîmes Olympique, where his career began to take off, playing 52 games and scoring four goals.

His potential was noticed by Troyes AC, which promptly signed him in 2005, when it was in Ligue 1. He experienced several ups and downs at the club, being relegated twice, and winning promotion twice too. From 2011, he was club captain, which he led to promotion to Ligue 1 once again at the end of the 2011–12 season.

He joined Valenciennes FC in 2013 and played five seasons for the club before being released in 2018.

In February 2019 he joined Annecy FC. On 28 May 2020, it was announced that his contract at Annecy, which had just been promoted to the Championnat National, would not be renewed.

In summer 2022, after two seasons at Racing Besançon, Yamissi retired from playing and became assistant coach to David Le Frapper at the club.

International career
Since its reformation in 2010, Enza Yamissi is a member of the Central African national team, which he captained on several occasions.

Personal life
Eloge is the brother of the Central African Republic national team player Manassé Enza-Yamissi.

Career statistics
Scores and results list Central African Republic's goal tally first, score column indicates score after each Enza Yamissi goal.

References

External links
 
 

1983 births
Living people
People from Bangui
French sportspeople of Central African Republic descent
French footballers
Central African Republic footballers
Association football midfielders
Central African Republic international footballers
La Roche VF players
Olympique Alès players
Nîmes Olympique players
ES Troyes AC players
Valenciennes FC players
FC Annecy players
Racing Besançon players
Ligue 1 players
Ligue 2 players
Championnat National players
Championnat National 2 players
Championnat National 3 players